Proteam may refer to:
 Proteam Motorsport, an Italian auto racing team.
 Proteam, a former Swedish educational company, acquired by Vittra.
 UCI ProTeam, a type of cycling team licensed to compete on the UCI World Tour